The 2021 Carlow Senior Hurling Championship was the 92nd staging of the Carlow Senior Hurling Championship since its establishment by the Carlow County Board in 1927. The championship began on 6 August 2021 and ended on 19 September 2021.

Mount Leinster Rangers entered the championship as the defending champions.

The final was played on 19 September 2021 at Netwatch Cullen Park, between Mount Leinster Rangers and St Mullin's, in what was their first ever meeting in a final in two years. Mount Leinster Rangers won the match by 0-24 to 0-16 to claim their 10th championship title overall and a second title in succession.

Results

Final

References

External links
 Carlow GAA website

Carlow Senior Hurling Championship
Carlow Senior Hurling Championship
Carlow Senior Hurling Championship